Ferrière-la-Petite is a commune in the Nord department in northern France. The river Solre flows through the commune.

Heraldry

See also
Communes of the Nord department

References

Ferrierelapetite